The name Openg was used for nine tropical cyclones in the Philippines by the PAGASA (and its predecessor, the Philippine Weather Bureau) in the Western Pacific Ocean. 

 Typhoon Harriet (1965) (T6513, 16W, Openg) – hit Taiwan as a Category 3-equivalent typhoon.
 Typhoon Flossie (1969) (T6912, 15W, Openg) – a typhoon which affected the Philippines, Taiwan and Japan, killing 75; considered by JTWC as merely a high-end tropical storm.
 Severe Tropical Storm Vera (1973) (T7321, 23W, Openg) – the final named storm of the 1973 season; affected the Philippines.
 Typhoon Dinah (1977) (T7712, 12W, Openg) – struck the Philippines before having an erratic track in the South China Sea, resulting to 54 lives lost.
 Typhoon Thad (1981) (T8115, 15W, Openg) – made landfall in Japan, causing widespread damage amounting to $1.03 billion and killing 43 people. 
 Severe Tropical Storm Andy (1985) (T8519, 18W, Openg) – hit Hainan and northern Vietnam at peak intensity, ultimately causing the deaths of 46 individuals.
 Typhoon Sarah (1989) (T8919, 22W, Openg) – a powerful typhoon which affected the Philippines, Taiwan and China, claiming 71 lives in total.
 Typhoon Robyn (1993) (T9307, 13W, Openg) – mid-season typhoon that impacted Japan and South Korea, resulting to 54 fatalities.
 Severe Tropical Storm Linda (1997) (T9726, 30W, Openg) – a strong tropical storm which later crossed into the North Indian Ocean after making landfalls in Vietnam and Thailand; considered as the most devastating typhoon to hit southern Vietnam, killing at least 3,111 people, in addition to 164 fatalities in Thailand.

Pacific typhoon set index articles